James Michael Pender (15 October 1911 – 12 August 1985), the son of James Robert Pender was an  Australian rules footballer who played with Geelong in the Victorian Football League (VFL).

Notes

External links 

1911 births
1985 deaths
Australian rules footballers from Geelong
Geelong Football Club players